Christian Luyindama Nekadio  (born 8 January 1994), is a Congolese professional footballer who plays as a defender for Antalyaspor. Luyindama is a versatile player who can also play as a defensive midfielder and forward.

Club career

Early career
Luyindama began his career in the Linafoot tournament with DCMP, moving to DCMP as an attacker, and then earning a spot with TP Mazembe with whom he won the 2016 CAF Confederation Cup.

Standard Liège
On 31 January 2017, Luyindama joined Standard Liège on loan with an option given to the club to sign him permanently. The move was made permanent on 18 May 2017.

On 17 March 2018, he played as Standard Liège beat Genk 1–0 in extra time to win the 2018 Belgian Cup Final and qualify for the UEFA Europa League.

Galatasaray
On 31 January 2019, the last day of the 2018–19 winter transfer window, Luyindama moved to Süper Lig side Galatasaray on loan until the end of the season. The deal included an option for to make the move permanent.

In November 2019 it was announced that he would undergo knee surgery.

Loan to Al Taawoun
On 30 January 2022, Galatasaray announced Luyindama's half-year deal with Saudi Arabian side Al Taawoun as on loan.

Loan to Antalyaspor
On 8 September 2022, he signed a 1-year loan contract with Süper Lig team Antalyaspor.

International career
Luyindama made his international debut for the DR Congo national football team in a 2–0 friendly win over Botswana on 5 June 2017.

Honours
TP Mazembe
CAF Confederation Cup: 2016

Standard Liège
 Belgian Cup: 2018

Galatasaray
 Süper Lig: 2018–19
 Turkish Cup:  2018–19
 Turkish Super Cup: 2019

Career statistics

Club

International

References

External links
 
 
 
 
 
 

Living people
1994 births
Association football defenders
Footballers from Kinshasa
Democratic Republic of the Congo footballers
Democratic Republic of the Congo international footballers
TP Mazembe players
Standard Liège players
Galatasaray S.K. footballers
Al-Taawoun FC players
Belgian Pro League players
Süper Lig players
Saudi Professional League players
Democratic Republic of the Congo expatriate footballers
Democratic Republic of the Congo expatriate sportspeople in Belgium
Democratic Republic of the Congo expatriate sportspeople in Turkey
Democratic Republic of the Congo expatriate sportspeople in Saudi Arabia
Expatriate footballers in Belgium
Expatriate footballers in Turkey
Expatriate footballers in Saudi Arabia
2019 Africa Cup of Nations players
21st-century Democratic Republic of the Congo people
Antalyaspor footballers